This is a list of equipment used by the Army of North Macedonia.

Individual equipment

Small arms

Military vehicles

Artillery

Air Force

Air defense

Retired equipment 
Sukhoi Su-25 x4 – retired
Kamov Ka-52 x2 - retired  
T-34/85 x4 – inherited from JNA, turned into museum pieces
BRDM-2 x10 – retired
BVP M-80 x2 - retired
T-55A x115 – 31 (military aid from Bulgaria), retired
BTR-60P x31 – retired
T-72A x? – unspecified amount donated to Ukraine
Mi-24v x6 – grounding on Petrovec air base

References

Military of North Macedonia
North Macedonia
North Macedonia